Republic Biscuit Corporation (d/b/a Rebisco) is a Philippine snack food company located in Pasig City (Office) and Quezon City (Factory), Philippines. It was founded in 1963 by Jacinto Ng.

History
Rebisco was founded in August 15, 1963, as England Biscuit Factory, producing biscuits from a tiny, rented second-hand factory in San Juan, with only US$5,000 in start-up (approximately ₱15,000 to ₱20,000). The company eventually moved out of its San Juan site to a new factory in Novaliches, Quezon City.

In 1972, England Biscuit Factory was renamed Republic Biscuit Corporation and adopted a new image. Through the years, Rebisco put up several companies to dominate other segments of the market: JBC Food Corporation in 1989; Suncrest Foods, Inc. in 1995; Multirich Corporation in 1999; and Pinnacle Foods, Inc. in 2000. In 2003, Rebisco acquired Storck Products, Inc., which previously produced confectionery products under license from August Storck, and later renamed the company as SPI Corporation.

Brands 

Biscuits:
 Bibibons
 Biskarte
 Bravo
 Coco
 Combi
 Jeanne And Jamies Recipes
 Jungle Bites
 Marie Gold
 Marie Time
 Rebisco Extreme
 Rebisco Sandwich
 Hansel Sandwich (The Hanchies)

Cakes and breads:
 Brownie Break
 Crossini
 Cupp Keyk
 Doowee Delectables
 Doowee Donut
 Doowette
 Fudgee Barr
 Jo'Anne Bakes Brownies
 Moji Cakes
 Topps Sarap
 Whoopie

Candies, lollipops, gums and jellies:
 Babble Joe
 Chubby
 Dolce
 Happy Jelly
 Jiggels
 Judge
 Mr. Buko
 Mr. Keso
 Mr. Maiz
 Mr. Melon
 Mr. Yema
 Starr
 Target Relief
 Vita Cubes
 Yaba Pops

Chips:
 Chiskalog
 Criss Cross
 Funky
 Goofers
 Kruffs
 Pier 28
 Potato Plus
 Torii
 Tostas

Chocolates:
 Barnuts
 Binx
 Choco Mucho
 Havana
 Twistee

Cookies:
 Choco Mucho Cookies
 Frootees
 Kookie Tart
 Mrs. Goodman
Crackers:
 Ace
 Buddy
 Hansel Crackers
 King Flakes Classic
 Rebisco Crackers
 Rebisco Grahams
 Super Thins Baked Chips

Creampaste:
 Happy Peanut Spread
 Krim Stix
 Rebisco Spreads

Ice Cream:
 Creamline

Nuts, peas and seeds:
 Chikito
 Ding Dong
 Happy
 Hi-Ho
 Captain Sid
 Dragon Sid

Polvoron:
 Milkee Polvoron
 Milkee's Best

Wafers:
 Superstix
 Tiger Stix
 Wafer Time
 Wafer Time Rich Cream

Subsidiaries 
 Suncrest Foods, Inc.
 SPI Corporation
 Multirich Food Corporation
 Pinnacle Foods, Inc.
 Creamline Dairy Corporation 
 JBC Food Corporation
 SPI Multimix Corporation

Sports 
 Choco Mucho Flying Titans (PVL)
 Creamline Cool Smashers (PVL)
 Rebisco-PSL Manila (2017 Asian Women's Club Volleyball Championship)

Other developments 
In February 2011, Y&R Philippines won the branding work for Rebisco. Y&R was tasked to create a new global brand for Rebisco. It will include the creation of a new logo and packaging unified mark to strongly identify the vast array of products.

References

External links
 
 

Confectionery companies of the Philippines
Snack food manufacturers of the Philippines
Companies based in Pasig
Food and drink companies established in 1963
1963 establishments in the Philippines
Philippine brands